ζ Lupi (Latinised as Zeta Lupi) is the brighter component of a wide double star in the constellation Lupus, consisting of an orange-hued primary and a fainter secondary with a golden-yellow hue. It is visible to the naked eye with a combined apparent visual magnitude of 3.41. Based upon an annual parallax shift of 27.80 mas as seen from Earth, it is located 117.3 light-years from the Sun.

This is a probable binary star system. As of 2013, the pair had an angular separation of 71.20 arcseconds along a position angle of 249°. The primary, component A, is an evolved G-type giant star with a visual magnitude of 3.50 and a stellar classification of G7 III. This is a red clump star, indicating that it is generating energy through the thermonuclear fusion of helium in its core region.

The secondary, component B, has a visual magnitude of 6.74.

References

G-type giants
Horizontal-branch stars
Double stars
Lupus (constellation)
Lupi, Zeta
Durchmusterung objects
134505
074395
5649